PT Bank Rakyat Indonesia (Persero) Tbk ( 'Indonesian People's Bank', commonly known as BRI) is one of the largest banks in Indonesia. It specialises in small scale and microfinance style borrowing from and lending to its approximately 30 million retail clients through its over 4,000 branches, units and rural service posts. It also has a comparatively small, but growing, corporate business. As of 2010, it is the second largest bank in Indonesia by asset.

BRI is the oldest bank in Indonesia, tracing back since 1895. It is currently 53% government owned operating company (Persero) and has been government-owned for the entire period since the war of independence (1945 to 1949) to November 2003, when 30% of its shares were sold through an IPO.

History 

BRI was founded in 1895, during the Dutch colonial period as De Poerwokertosche Hulp en Spaarbank der Inlandsche Hoofden (Help and Savings Bank for Purwokerto's Aristocrats) by Raden Bei Aria Wirjaatmadja in Purwokerto, Central Java. It then underwent its first (of many) name changes to Hulp en Spaarbank der Inlandsche Bestuurs Ambtenaren (Help and Savings Bank for Local Civil Servants).

Going through several name changes, its final name during the colonial period was Algemene Volkscredietbank (People's General Credit Bank, AVB) in 1934. This translates loosely into Indonesian as Bank Rakyat Serikat. At this point it was one of the largest institutions in the (then) colony.

After the Indonesian declaration of independence, on 17 August 1945 the bank was officially nationalised by the new government and then renamed Bank Rakyat Indonesia Serikat. BRI gained its current name and limited company status in 1992.

BRI was nearly unique in Indonesia in the East Asian financial crisis of 1997, in that its operations were largely unaffected. This was because it had very little, if any, lending in foreign currencies or to the large corporations that had been borrowing heavily overseas, as most of the other large Indonesian banks had.

Since then BRI has been concentrating on increasing its core business and improving its risk management practices. As part of the reformasi (reform) process in Indonesia since 1998, the government has been steadily reducing its influence on the Bank's day-to-day operations, culminating in its IPO. It is also seeking to comply with the Basel II accords, as mandated by Bank Indonesia, by 2008.

During period of 2006–2011, its assets jumped almost 62%. The bank topped the list of the nation's most profitable banks for six years, recording assets of Rp 249.56 trillion (US$28.6 billion) in 2010, up from Rp 154.72 trillion in 2006.

Satellite 

In April 2014, BRI contracted with Space Systems/Loral and Arianespace to, respectively, build and launch their first satellite, a  C-band and Ku-band spacecraft dubbed BRIsat, and on 18 June 2016, Ariane 5 has successfully launched BRIsat as the first satellite owned and operated by a bank in the world to link the bank's geographically isolated branches.

BRI Partner Award 

Source:

Hardware Category

 Top Data Center Solution – PT. Bringin Inti Teknologi 
 Top Compute Service Solution – PT. Info Solusindo Data Utama 
 Top Network Data Center Solution – PT. Mastersystem Infotama

Software Category

 Top Core Banking System – PT. Structured Services (Silverlake) 
 Top Integration System – PT. Mitra Integrasi Informatika 
 Top Distribution System – PT. Metalogic Infomitra

Network Category

 Top Network Services – PT. Satkomindo Mediyasa 
 Top M2M Platform – PT Telekomunikasi Selular 
 Top Network Solution – PT. Telkom Indonesia (Persero) Tbk

Consultant Category

 Top Digital Strategy – PT. Sharing Vision Indonesia 
 Top Digital Governance – PT Deloitte Consulting 
 Top Management Quality – PT Robere Manajemen Indonesia

Non IT Category

 Top IT Facility Support – PT. Bringin Karya Sejahtera

References

External links 

 Official website
 English language website
 Investor Relation website (in English)
 Detail layanan KUR BRI
 Download Bank Bri Logos here

 
Banks of Indonesia
Microfinance organizations
Government-owned banks of Indonesia
Companies listed on the Indonesia Stock Exchange
Banks established in 1895
Companies based in Jakarta
Indonesian brands
1895 establishments in the Dutch East Indies
2003 initial public offerings